Kelly McCallum may refer to:
 Kelly McCallum (artist)
 Kelly McCallum (rugby union)